Pandharpur Wari or Wari is a yatra to Pandharpur, Maharashtra, to honor Vithoba. It involves carrying the paduka of a saint in a palkhi, most notably of Dnyaneshwar and Tukaram, from their respective shrines to Pandharpur. Many pilgrims join this procession on foot. Warkari is a Marathi term which means "one who performs the wari". The tradition is more than 700 to 800 years old.

Marches happen on foot from various locations in Maharashtra to Vithoba Temple. The journey takes 21 days. Many palkis join the main Tukaram and Dnyaneshwar palkhis along the way. Two specific pilgrimages honor the two most revered palkhis, starting from their towns located in Pune district of Maharashtra: Sant Dnyaneshwar's palkhi leaves from Alandi, while Tukaram's begins at Dehu. The wari culminates at the Vithoba Temple on the holy occasion of Shayani Ekadashi. Devotees from across Maharashtra and nearby areas leave for Pandharpur, wearing holy basil beads and singing the glories of Vithoba and songs like "Gyanba Tukaram", commemorating the saints. When they reach Pandharpur on Shayani Ekadashi, the devotees bathe in the sacred Bhima River before visiting the temple.

History

Beginnings
Various views exists on the origins of the wari (Marathi: पंढरपूरची वारी or वारी). According to one theory, Vitthalpant, the father of the Varkari saint Dnyaneshwar, began the wari to visit Pandharpur in the Hindu months of Ashadha and Kartik. The tradition of performing a Wari is generally regarded to have existed for more than 800 years.

Another theory credits Dnyaneshwar and Tukaram to have started the pilgrimage. They used to take a journey to Pandharpur by foot for 15 days, reaching Pandharpur's Vithoba Temple on Shayani Ekadashi. The tradition of carrying the paduka of the saints was started by the Tukaram's youngest son, Narayan Maharaj, in 1685.

British era
Changes were brought to the pilgrimage in the 1820s by Tukaram's descendants and a devotee of Dnyaneshwar named Haibatravbaba Arphalkar, who was a courtier of the Scindias. Haibatravbaba is credited with the organization of the wari in use today. This involved carrying the paduka in a palkhi, having horses involved in the procession, and organizing the devotees or varkaris in Dindis (Dindi stands for a specific group of varkaris).

Wari in present times
The Warkaris—whose patron deity is Vithoba—undertake the wari to Pandharpur, reaching there on a day before Shayani Ekadashi, the eleventh lunar day (Ekadashi) of the bright fortnight (Shukla Paksha) of Ashadha (June–July). Pilgrims carry palanquins of the saints from the places of their respective samadhi.

Dindi
The concept of Dindi (Marathi: दिंडी procession) or troupes of warkari devotees was introduced by Haibatravbaba in the early 1800s. A diṇḍī is a group of Hindu devotees of one caste or village who are part of a larger palkhi going to a holy site on pilgrimage. Some religious institutions and temples also have their own Dindi. Accommodation, meals and other facilities to warkaris are provided through their respective Dindi. Managing members of a Dindi usually travel ahead to make arrangements for food and shelter at their next stop. All registered Dindis are numbered and assigned their place in the procession. Some walk in front of the palkhi and others behind it. During their march, flag and banner-carrying members are at the front of the troupe, and the drummer is at the center the Dindi.

Along with the procession, sevā is performed for the poor and needy, like dāna.
The event is said to be one of the world's largest and oldest movement where people gather on one day each year and walk a distance of around 250 km. The Pandharpur Wari has been classified by the World Book of Records as "one of the most visited places in a day".

Wari management 
The Dnyaneshwar palkhi is managed by Haibatraobua Arphalkar's descendants, the hereditary Chopdars, and the Alandi Devasthan Trust.

The wari schedule is published ahead of time and is strictly followed. It is detailed and minute details are made available, including starting location and the location of breaks, including lunch, rest and night stays. Every morning at early dawn, after worshiping the Saint's footwear, the palkhi leaves at 6am for the next stretch of the route. A tutari (wind instrument) is blown thrice to alert all Warkaris. At the first signal, all warkaris get ready to leave. At the second signal, the Dindis stand in line and start walking at the third signal. After 4 to 5 km, they take a quick break for breakfast.

Economic impact
An estimated one million pilgrims, either varkaris traveling with the palkhi or independent travelers, travel to Pandharpur each year, who require accommodation provided by the mathas and temporary lodging houses.

Public health issues
Because the wari brings many people on the way to Pandharpur through many localities, public health measures have been implemented since the early British colonial period. These included compulsory vaccinations for diseases, such as cholera and plague, segregation of the infected, and restrictions on mobility. According to Manjiri Kamat, the colonial administrators had other motivations, such as generating revenue by collecting pilgrim tax, or maintaining law and order for implementing public health measures. The colonial government's public health measures in the early part of the 20th century included attaching medical staff to different palkhis, removing infected persons, modifying wells for drinking water, digging trenches, providing bins for waste collection, and employing sanitation staff. The requirement to be vaccinated against cholera and typhoid in order to join a dindi has continued in the present times.

In 2020, due to the COVID-19 pandemic, the wari was reduced with fifty varkaris joining the march to Pandharpur. The paduka of the saints were either driven to or flown to Pandharpur for Shayani Ekadashi on July 1, 2020.

Goa Dindi festival
The Dindi festival is an annual festival held in Margao, Goa's Vithal Rakhumai temple, and the Damodar Temple in the month of November. The Dindi festival is dedicated to Hindu deity Vithoba, the festival dates back to 1909. It is one of the oldest festivals in Salcete(Margao) taluka.

See also
 आषाढी वारी (पंढरपूर) on Marathi Wikipedia
 Bhakti movement
 Dindi dance
 Sant Mat
 Famous Hindu yatras
 Hindu pilgrimage sites in India
 List of Hindu festivals
 Padayatra
 Ratha Yatra
 Tirtha
 Vitthal Temple, Pandharpur (section Dindi Yatra)

References

External links
Some Videos: use Hash code #Bhaktivatavaran on Youtube and watch dindi videos

Hindu pilgrimages
Maharashtra
Pilgrimage in India
Tourist attractions in Solapur district
Warkari